Davey Lee Armstrong (June 9, 1956 – February 8, 2021) was a boxer from the United States.

Amateur career
Armstrong was born in Puyallup, Washington, and began boxing at the Tacoma Boys Club, along with future world champions Rocky Lockridge and Johnny Bumphus, as well as 1972 Olympic Gold Medalist Sugar Ray Seales and 1976 Gold Medalist and professional World Champion, Leo "The Lion" Randolph.

Armstrong represented the US at the 1972 Summer Olympics. He was eliminated in the second round of the men's light flyweight division (– 48 kg) by bronze medalist Enrique Rodríguez.  Armstrong also was a member of the American Olympic team at the 1976 Montreal Olympics.  He competed as a featherweight and was eliminated in the quarterfinals.

Amateur highlights
 1972 National AAU Champion (106 lb)
 1972 U.S. Olympian (106 lb)
 1973 National AAU Runner-up (119 lb), lost to Mike Hess of Albany, Oregon, in the final by decision.
 1975 National AAU Champion (125 lb)
 Won the gold medal at the 1975 Pan American Games.
 1976 National AAU Champion (125 lb)
 1976 U.S. Olympian (Placed Fifth)
 1979 National AAU Champion (132 lb)

1976 Olympic results
Below is the record of Davey Armstrong, an American featherweight boxer who competed at the 1976 Montreal Olympics:

 Round of 64: bye
 Round of 32: defeated Anatoly Volkov (Soviet Union) by decision, 5-0
 Round of 16: defeated Tibor Badari (Hungary) by decision, 5-0
 Quarterfinal: lost to Angel Herrera (Cuba) by decision, 2-3

Pro career
Armstrong turned pro as a lightweight on March 28, 1980 and boxed out of the Kronk Gym in Detroit.   He never lived up to the potential that he showed as an amateur boxer, and never challenged for a major boxing title as a professional.  Armstrong retired in 1983 after 27 bouts (24 wins and 3 losses).

Life after boxing
Armstrong lived in Puyallup, Washington, and worked for the City of Seattle as a bookkeeper. He died from dementia on February 8, 2021.

Honors
 2005 Inductee into the Tacoma (Pierce County) Sports Hall of Fame

References
 

1956 births
2021 deaths
Boxers from Washington (state)
Lightweight boxers
Olympic boxers of the United States
Boxers at the 1972 Summer Olympics
Boxers at the 1976 Summer Olympics
Sportspeople from Puyallup, Washington
American male boxers
Boxers at the 1975 Pan American Games
Pan American Games gold medalists for the United States
Pan American Games medalists in boxing
Medalists at the 1975 Pan American Games
Deaths from dementia
20th-century American people